Erin Mathews is a Canadian voice actress. She graduated from the Studio 58 theater program. She has worked in theaters across Canada, and is a founding member of the Theatre Melee collective.

Filmography

References

External links 
 
 

Living people
Canadian stage actresses
Canadian voice actresses
20th-century Canadian actresses
21st-century Canadian actresses
Pac-Man